Weissia multicapsularis, the many-fruited beardless-moss, is an ephemeral moss. It is critically endangered.

Distribution 
It is found in France, Cornwall, Wales, and Turkey.
It grows on damp and muddy non-calcareous soils. It is found on banks hedges, and tracksides.

Taxonomy 
It was named by William Mitten, in  Ann. Mag. Nat. History, ser. 2 8: 317 in 1851.

References

External links 
 South Wales Bryophytes: Rare fungus on Weissia multicapsularis

Pottiaceae